Milton K. Ozaki (June 14, 1913 – November 7, 1989) was a Japanese-American writer.

Life
Ozaki was born in Racine, Wisconsin to a Japanese father (Jingaro Ozaki, who later changed his name to Frank) and an American mother, Augusta Rathbun. He lost a leg as a young child. In addition to his work as a writer and journalist, he operated a beauty parlor (the Monsieur Meltoine beauty salon, in the Gold Coast section of Chicago). Ozaki and his wife Dolores B. Ozaki lived at 6314 Fifth Avenue in Kenosha, Wisconsin. In the 1970s, he operated phony mail-order colleges, including the Colorado State Christian College and Hamilton State University, and he was also involved in a company marketing a device fraudulently claimed to increase gas mileage. He died in Reno, Nevada.

Writing
Ozaki was the author of approximately two dozen popular mid-20th century detective novels under both his given name and the pseudonym Robert O. Saber, and was one of the first American mystery writers of Japanese descent. His novels are set in the fictional, mid-sized southeastern-Wisconsin city of Stillwell, Wisconsin, which is actually a barely disguised Kenosha.

Novels

The Cuckoo Clock (1946) - Also published under the title "Too Many Women" (1947)
A Fiend in Need (1947)
The Ram of Aries (1947)
The Black Dark Murders (1949) - Also published under the title "Out Of The Dark" (1954)
The Affair of the Frigid Blonde (1950) - Also published under the title "The Deadly Blonde" (1953)
The Deadly Lover (1951)
The Scented Flesh (1951)
The Dummy Murder Case (1951)
The Dove (1951) - Also published under the title "Chicago Woman" (1953)
No Way Out (1952) - Also published under the title "Borrowed Time" (1955)
Murder Doll (1952)
The Deadly Pickup (1953)
Murder Honeymoon (1953)
City of Sin (1952)
Dressed to Kill (1954)
Too Young to Die (1954)
Shake Hands With The Devil (1954)
Maid For Murder (1955)
A Dame Called Murder (1955)
Marked For Murder (1955)
Model for Murder (1955)
Sucker Bait (1955)
Never Say Die (1956)
A Time For Murder (1956)
Case of the Deadly Kiss (1957)
The Case of the Cop's Wife (1958)
Wake Up and Scream (1959)
Inquest (1960)
Too Cute To Kill (Publish date unknown)

Games
Milton K. Ozaki also designed a dice game, Murder Dice, which was similar to Yahtzee and was based on the events in a murder trial.

Notes

1913 births
1989 deaths
Writers from Racine, Wisconsin
People from Kenosha, Wisconsin
American mystery writers
American writers of Japanese descent
American novelists of Asian descent
20th-century American novelists
American male novelists
20th-century American male writers
Novelists from Wisconsin